Kavapoint is an iPhone mobile app developer. The company was founded in May 2009 to develop mobile applications. They are based in the San Francisco Bay Area with the mission to develop products that reduce stress and improve lives. Their tagline is “We make Apps to Make Life Better”.

Applications
Kavapoint specialises in medical and health iPhone applications.

 June 2009 – Kavapoint launched an "In case of emergency" (ICE) app called iEmergency+. According to TopAppCharts.com, iEmergency+ peaked at #72 in top medical iPhone apps on May 27, 2012. It was listed as one of the most useful iPhone apps by Master of Health Administration.
 September 2009 – Kavapoint introduced iEmergency ICE Family PRO which became #91 in top medical iPhone apps on December 14, 2013.
November 2009 – Kavapoint introduced Drugs & Medications. It was listed as one of the top-rated healthcare smartphone apps on the iOS App Store by MassHighTech.com.

Kavapoint has had a number of other apps reach the top 50 in the medical category including the following:
 Drugs & Medications PRO: #12 on May 25, 2018
 ICU Pearls: #11 on September 2, 2009
 Pet Health: #36 on January 10, 2010
 Daily Bible Verses: #10 on March 25, 2010

Humanitarian Efforts
Kavapoint participates in micro-lending via Kiva.

See also
List of mobile app distribution platforms

References

External links
http://www.kavapoint.com

Mobile software
2009 establishments in California